Lucas Carstensen (born 16 June 1994) is a German professional racing cyclist, who currently rides for UCI Continental team .

Career
Born in Hamburg, Carstensen was the leader during the 2017 Tour de Tunisie. He finished the event winning the points classification. Carstensen also won three stages and the points classification at the 2017 Tour du Senegal, and a stage at the 2017 Tour of Xingtai.

Carstensen won the first stage at the 2018 La Tropicale Amissa Bongo.  At the finish he defeated Adrien Petit. He retained the race leader's yellow jersey on the second day.

Major results

2017
 1st Stage 3 Tour of Xingtai
 3rd Overall Tour du Sénégal
1st  Points classification
1st Stages 1, 6 & 8
 3rd Sparkassen Giro Bochum
 5th Overall Tour de Tunisie
1st  Points classification
1st Stage 2
 8th GP Al Massira Les Challenges de la Marche Verte
2018
 1st Stage 1 Tropicale Amissa Bongo
 1st Stage 2 Tour of Hainan
 1st Stage 5 Rás Tailteann
 7th Overall Belgrade Banjaluka
 10th Münsterland Giro
2019
 1st Grand Prix Alanya
2020
 1st Stage 2 Tour of Romania
 8th Overall Tour of Thailand 
1st Stages 2 & 5 
2021 
 4th Overall Tour of Thailand 
1st  Points classification
1st Stages 1, 2, 4 & 5
2022
 1st Stage 1 Tour of Romania
 1st Stage 2 Tour of Azerbaijan (Iran)
2023
 1st Stage 5 New Zealand Cycle Classic
 1st Stage 5 Tour of Sharjah

References

External links

1994 births
Living people
German male cyclists
Cyclists from Hamburg